Craigs Dolmen (also known as the Broad Stone) is situated three miles north of Rasharkin, County Antrim, Northern Ireland, close to a minor road, at a height of 200m on the Long Mountain. Craigs Dolmen passage tomb is a State Care Historic Monument in the townland of Craigs, in Borough of Ballymoney, at grid ref: C9740 1729.

Features
Lightning broke the capstone in 1976. It was restored in 1985, and excavation revealed that the chamber was the remnants of a passage tomb at the time. It was most likely erected before 2000 BC, although it was re-used for burial throughout the Bronze Age.

The large capstone over the entrance and the first chamber of this 3-chambered tomb was re-erected using an upright stone at the rear which probably was not an original feature. The almost semicircular forecourt faces south-east. The Broad Stone was only a popular place for meetings and assemblies.

Nearby site

On the other side of the road and 800m south-west is a small passage tomb. Seven close, tall uprights support a flat capstone measuring 210x160cm. On the south-west side, two fallen stones may be the remains of a short passage. No cairn survives.

See also
List of archaeological sites in County Antrim

References

External links
Shadows and Stone - Photographs of Craigs Dolmen

Archaeological sites in County Antrim
Megalithic monuments in Ireland